Freda Warrington is a British author, known for her epic fantasy, vampire and supernatural novels. Four of her novels (Dark Cathedral, Pagan Moon, Dracula the Undead, and The Amber Citadel) have been nominated for the British Fantasy Society's Best Novel award. 
Dracula the Undead won the Dracula Society's 1997 Children of the Night Award. Her novel, Elfland, won the Romantic Times Reviewers' Choice Award in the Fantasy Novel category for 2009. Warrington has also seen numerous short stories published in anthologies and magazines.

Born in Leicester, Warrington grew up in Leicestershire. After completing high school, she trained at the Loughborough College of Art and Design and afterward held a job at the Medical Illustration Department of Leicester Royal Infirmary. She eventually moved to full-time writing, pursuing a love she had had since childhood. In addition to her writing, Warrington works part-time in the Charnwood Forest. Some of her books are set in Leicestershire, such as the recent Aetherial Tales series, depicting the lives, loves and adventures of magical people living hidden in this region, passing for - and sharing many cultural traits with - ordinary English people.

Novels 

 The Rainbow Gate (1989)
 Sorrow's Light (1993)
 Dracula the Undead (1997) (published in French as Le retour de Dracula, in German as Dracula, Der Untote kehrt zurück, and in Korean as 드라큘라의 부활)
 The Court of the Midnight King (2003)
 Blackbird series
 A Blackbird in Silver (1986)
 A Blackbird in Darkness (1986)
 A Blackbird in Amber (1987)
 A Blackbird in Twilight (1988)
 Darker than the Storm (1990)
 Blood Wine series
 A Taste of Blood Wine (1992)
 A Dance in Blood Velvet (1994)
 The Dark Blood of Poppies (1995)
 The Dark Arts of Blood (2015)
 Dark Cathedral series
 Dark Cathedral (1996)
 Pagan Moon (1997)
 The Jewelfire Trilogy
 The Amber Citadel (1999)
 The Sapphire Throne (2000)
 The Obsidian Tower (2001)
 Aetherial Tales series
 Elfland (2009)
 Midsummer Night (2010)
 Grail of the Summer Stars (2013)

References

External links
 Freda Warrington Official Site
 

 Story behind Aetherial Tales and Grail of the Summer Stars - Online Essay
 Story behind A Taste of Blood Wine - Online Essay
 Grail of the Summer Stars review
 

Year of birth missing (living people)
Living people
British fantasy writers
Alumni of Loughborough University
Women science fiction and fantasy writers